Plug Me In is an album by American jazz saxophonist Eddie Harris recorded in 1968 and released on the Atlantic label. The title is a reference to Harris's use of a Varitone device to electronically amplify and process his saxophone.

This is the album referenced in the first line of Beastie Boys' song So What'cha Want, from their 1992 album Check Your Head.

Reception
The Allmusic review calls it "One of Eddie Harris's more underrated sessions... The only real fault to this enjoyable set is that the playing time is under 27 minutes".  The record was arranged by another Chicago musician, Charles Stepney, who was mainly associated with Chess Records as a staff writer, arranger and producer at the time. Atlantic's Joel Dorn produced the set.

Track listing
All compositions by Eddie Harris except as indicated
 "Live Right Now" - 6:58
 "It's Crazy" - 3:09
 "Ballad (For My Love)" - 3:22
 "Lovely Is Today" - 4:28
 "Theme in Search of a T.V. Commercial" (Charles Stepney) - 4:11
 "Winter Meeting" (Stepney) - 4:50
Recorded in New York City on March 14 (tracks 1,  2 & 5) and March 15 (tracks 3, 4 & 6), 1968

Personnel
Eddie Harris - tenor saxophone, varitone
Melvin Lastie, Joe Newman, Jimmy Owens - trumpet
Garnett Brown (tracks 3, 4 & 6), Tom McIntosh (tracks 1, 2 & 5) - trombone
Haywood Henry - baritone saxophone
Jodie Christian - piano
Ron Carter (tracks 3, 4 & 6), Melvin Jackson (tracks 1, 2 & 5) - bass
Chuck Rainey - electric bass
Richard Smith, Grady Tate - drums

References 

Eddie Harris albums
1968 albums
Albums produced by Joel Dorn
Atlantic Records albums